Porto Urucu Airport  is the airport serving the district of Porto Urucu in Coari, Brazil.

It is operated by Petrobras.

History
The airport was built as a support facility to the Urucu oil and natural gas province and the Urucu–Manaus pipeline.

Airlines and destinations

Access

See also

List of airports in Brazil

References

External links

Airports in Amazonas (Brazilian state)